Taleqan County is in Alborz province, Iran. The capital of the county is the city of Taleqan, formerly Shahrak. At the 2006 census, the region's population (as Taleqan District of Savojbolagh County, Tehran province) was 25,781 in 7,574 households.At the 2016 census, the population was 16,815, in 6,354 households, by which time the district had been separated from the county to form Taleqan County in the recently established Alborz province.

The area is known for its mild, sunny summers and cold winters. Nasser al-Din Shah Qajar is quoted as saying of Taleqan weather: Har che dar Tehran harf ast, dar inja barf ast (As much as there is politics in Tehran, there is snow here).

Administrative divisions

The population history and structural changes of Taleqan County's administrative divisions over two censuses are shown in the following table. The latest census shows two districts, four rural districts, and one city.

Notable people

Politics:

 Ayatollah Seyed Mahmoud Taleghani, Iranian Revolutionary Leader

 Heshmat Taleqani, a leader in Jungle Movement of Gilan

Science:

 Maryam Mirzakhani first female Fields Medalist

 Reza Mansouri, Physicist

 Reza Shabani، Historian

 Mostafa Ronaghi, Molecular Biologist

Military:

 Valiollah Fallahi, Major General، Chief of Joint Staff of Iran Army

 Amir-Bahman Bagheri, Major General، Commander of Iran Air Force

Art and Literature:

 Darvish Khan, Musician

 Jalal Al-e-Ahmad, Writer

 Abdol Majid Taleqani, Calligrapher

 Gholam Hossein Amirkhani, Calligrapher

 Enayatollah Bakhshi, Actor

 Mohammad Davoudi, Writer

Situation
In recent years, the construction of Taleqan dam and installation of its hydroelectric project on Shahrood (River) (a right-hand tributary of the Sefīd-Rūd) has added new dimensions to the region's touristic attractions and infrastructure development although it is also becoming a serious issue for the environment.

Etymology
Some folk etymology says that the name Taleqan means "separators" in Persian, but Dehkhoda says that: Taleqan root is Talcan from talc because of existence of talc mine there. تالکان
ٍTalc in English is a loan word from Arabic , from Persian talk "talc". Talc

References

 

Counties of Alborz Province